For codepage, see CP850.

Year 850 (DCCCL) was a common year starting on Wednesday (link will display the full calendar) of the Julian calendar.

Events 
 By place 

 Europe 
 February 1 – King Ramiro I dies in his palace at Santa María del Naranco (near Oviedo), after an 8-year reign. He is succeeded by his son Ordoño I, as ruler of Asturias.
 Danish Viking raiders, led by King Rorik, conquer Dorestad and Utrecht (modern-day Netherlands). Emperor Lothair I recognizes him as ruler of most of Friesland.
 King Louis II, the eldest son of Lothair I, is crowned joint emperor by Pope Leo IV at Rome, and becomes co-ruler of the Middle Frankish Kingdom.

 Britain 
 King Kenneth I (also called Kenneth MacAlpin) of Alba (modern Scotland) invades Northern Northumbria during the period of 850–858, burning Dunbar and Melrose.
 The Pillar of Eliseg is erected by King Cyngen ap Cadell of Powys (Wales), as a memorial to his great-grandfather Elisedd ap Gwylog (or Eliseg) (approximate date).

 Japan 
 May 6 – Emperor Ninmyō dies after a 17-year reign. He is succeeded by his son Montoku, as the 55th emperor of Japan.

 India 
 It is hypothesized that sometime around 850 a group of Buddhist pilgrims travelling through a valley near Roopkund (modern India) were killed when caught out in the open in a sudden hailstorm. Their remains were discovered in 1942.

 Mesoamerica 
 Uxmal becomes the capital of a large state in the Puuk hills region of northern Yucatán (modern Mexico). The city is connected by causeways (sakbe) to other important Puuk sites, such as K'abah, Sayil, and Labna (approximate date).

 By topic 

 Food and Drink 
 Coffee is discovered (according to legend) by the Ethiopian goatherder Kaldi in East Africa, who notices that his goats become energetic after chewing the red berries from certain wild bushes (approximate date).

 Religion 
 April 22 – Gunther becomes archbishop of Cologne (modern Germany).
 June 18 – Perfecto, a Christian priest in Muslim Córdoba, is executed (beheaded) after he refuses to retract numerous insults he made about the prophet Muhammad.

Births 
 June 27 – Ibrahim II, emir of the Aghlabids (d. 902)
 Abu Zayd al-Balkhi, Muslim mathematician (d. 934)
 Adelaide, queen of the West Frankish Kingdom (or 853)
 Aribo of Austria, Frankish margrave (approximate date)
 Arnulf of Carinthia, king of the East Frankish Kingdom (d. 899)
 Berno of Cluny, Frankish abbot (approximate date)
 Du Guangting, Chinese Taoist priest and writer (d. 933)
 Gerolf of Holland, count of Friesland (approximate date)
 Harald Fairhair, king of Norway (approximate date)
 Hatto I, Frankish archbishop (approximate date)
 Herbert I, count of Vermandois (approximate date)
 Hermenegildo Gutiérrez, Galician nobleman (d. 912)
 Hucbald, Frankish music theorist (or 840)
 Ki no Tomonori, Japanese poet (approximate date)
 Onneca Fortúnez, Basque princess (or 848)
 Ranulf II, duke of Aquitaine (d. 890)
 Reginar I, duke of Lorraine (approximate date)
 Seiwa, emperor of Japan (d. 878)
 Smbat I, king of Armenia (approximate date)
 Tuotilo, German monk and composer (approximate date)

Deaths 
 February 1 – Ramiro I, king of Asturias
 May 6 – Ninmyō, emperor of Japan (b. 808)
 April 18 – Perfectus, Spanish monk and martyr
 July 14 – Wei Fu, chancellor of the Tang Dynasty
 Amalarius, Frankish archbishop (approximate date)
 Bishr al-Hafi, Muslim theologian (approximate date)
 Eanred, king of Northumbria (approximate date)
 Huangbo Xiyun, Chinese Zen Buddhist monk
 Ishaq ibn Ibrahim, Muslim official and advisor
 Li Deyu, chancellor of the Tang Dynasty (b. 787)
 Muhammad ibn Mūsā al-Khwārizmī, Persian mathematician
 Maura of Troyes, Frankish noblewoman and saint (b. 827)
 Tachibana no Kachiko, empress of Japan (b. 786)
 Stephen of Liège, Frankish bishop (approximate date)
 Vlastimir, Serbian prince (approximate date)
 William of Septimania, Frankish nobleman (b. 826)
 Zhou Lin, governor (jiedushi) of the Tang Dynasty

References